Camden City Hall is the house of government for the City of Camden and Camden County in the U.S. state of New Jersey. At , it is the tallest building in Camden and the tallest building within the Philadelphia metropolitan area outside of Philadelphia.

Building
The city hall was designed by Byron Edwards and Alfred Green, architectural partners who moved from Philadelphia to Camden in 1928, and its materials were supplied by the Otis Elevator Company. The building features a slender tower rising from a massive base, and its facade is composed of light gray granite. At the top of the tower is a large clock, consistent with a Camden tradition of city hall clocks begun in 1876.

Old City Hall

Camden's first city hall was built in 1876 at the corner of Benson Street and Haddon Avenue, where present day Cooper University Hospital (Kelemen Pavilion at 1 Cooper Plaza) is located. The building featured a clock tower and was demolished in 1930.

Quotations
The south face of the tower bears the engraving "In a dream I saw a city invincible," an excerpt from the poem "I Dream'd in a Dream" by Walt Whitman and the current motto of Camden. The front of the building has the phrase "No Legacy is so Rich as Honesty", a line from All's Well that Ends Well by William Shakespeare. The front also bears the inscription "Where There is no Vision the People Perish", a quote from Proverbs 29:18 of the King James Bible.

See also
List of tallest buildings in Camden

References

External links
City of Camden
Camden City Hall at emporis.com
Camden City Hall at skyscraperpage.com

Buildings and structures in Camden, New Jersey
Government buildings completed in 1931
Clock towers in New Jersey
Skyscrapers in New Jersey
Skyscraper office buildings in New Jersey
City and town halls in New Jersey
Neoclassical architecture in New Jersey